The following is a list of CubeSats, nanosatellites used primarily by universities for research missions, typically in low Earth orbits. Some CubeSats became their country's first national satellite. The extensive Nanosatellite and CubeSat Database lists nearly 4,000 CubeSats and NanoSats have been launched since 1998. The organization forecasts that 2080 nanosats will launch within the next 6 years.

Research and development 
 SBUDNIC was launched to test Arduino Nano and other commercial off-the-shelf technology in space, using a simple, open-source design. 
 An ambitious project is the QB50, an international network of 50 CubeSats for multi-point by different universities and other teams, in-situ measurements in the lower thermosphere (90–350 km) and re-entry research. QB50 is an initiative of the von Karman Institute and is funded by the European Union. Double-unit ("2-U") CubeSats (10x10x20 cm) are foreseen, with one unit (the 'functional' unit) providing the usual satellite functions and the other unit (the 'science' unit) accommodating a set of standardized sensors for lower thermosphere and re-entry research. 35 CubeSats are envisaged to be provided by universities in 19 European countries, 10 by universities in the US, 2 by universities in Canada, 3 by Japanese universities, 1 by an institute in Brazil, and others. Ten double or triple CubeSats are foreseen to serve for in-orbit technology demonstration of new space technologies. All 50 CubeSats may be launched together on a single Cyclone-4 launch vehicle in February 2016. The Request for Proposals (RFP) for the QB50 CubeSat was released on February 15, 2012.
 AAU CubeSat, by Aalborg University: The Danish students in this project, beginning in the summer of 2001, designed a satellite that would evaluate the technology and demonstrate the capabilities of the CubeSat concept. In order to successfully show the technology to the public, the team installed a camera on board the spacecraft, and outfitted it with a magnetically based attitude control system. But upon reaching orbit, the radio signals were weaker than expected and the batteries failed after only one month of semi-operational activity.
 AAUSAT3 is the third student-built CubeSat from Aalborg University in Denmark. The primary payload is an automatic identification system (AIS) receiver which primary task is to receive AIS data from ships around Greenland. Launched 25 February 2013 on the Indian PSLV C20. AAUSAT3 is the very first student satellite operating AIS receivers and the first demonstration of the AAU developed CSP communication protocol - internally on CANBUS on spacelink at UHF (FSK, 9600/19200). The mission has been successful.
 PW-Sat, by Warsaw University of Technology: This experiment revolves around CubeSats themselves. The test will involve developing a method to deorbit CubeSats by engaging an atmospheric drag device. The mission's focus will be the testing of this foil device; its deployment to intentionally bring the satellite back into the thicker portion of Earth's atmosphere to bring the mission to an end.  The satellite is Poland's first. The satellite was delivered to orbit on the maiden flight of the European Space Agency's new launch vehicle in 2012.
 OUFTI-1, by the University of Liège and I.S.I.L (Haute École de la Province de Liège): This is a 1-unit CubeSat that is being built by Belgian students. The name is an acronym for Orbital Utility For Telecommunication Innovation. This Belgian satellite was planned to launch on the maiden flight of Vega. The goal of the project is to develop experience in the different aspects of satellite design and operation. In the communications portion of the device, the academic team will be experimenting with the D-STAR digital voice mode and communications protocol that is popular with amateur radio operators. The satellite has a mass of just 1 kilogram and will utilize a UHF uplink and a VHF downlink.
 CubeSat TestBed 1, by Boeing: Boeing successfully completed all of its design and operational goals with its first nanosatellite. It was built and flown to explore the possibilities with the new CubeSat standard. Boeing satellites are usually much larger; a Boeing 601 or 702 satellite has 1,000 times the mass of their 1 kilogram CubeSat.
 InnoSAT, by Astronautic Technology Sdn Bhd: This CubeSat will test attitude control and navigation technologies developed by five Malaysian universities.
 XSAS, by University of Michigan: This project, based on graduate research, will house an accordion folded solar array inside a 1U CubeSat. The array will extend into a long solar panel once in orbit, thereby increasing by many times the power available to an attached CubeSat.
 Clyde Space is a company that started development of subsystems for CubeSats in 2005, including electrical power systems, attitude control systems, and pulsed-plasma thruster propulsion systems. In 2010 the UK Space Agency awarded Clyde Space the UK's first CubeSat mission, UKube-1, and a 3U CubeSat was launched in July 2014.
 Aerojet began developing a propulsion system for CubeSats in 2011 that occupies a 1U baseline volume and readily integrates with other CubeSat platforms to create modular, fully mobile CubeSats. Dubbed "CHAMPS", this system utilizes chemical propulsion and offers significantly more total impulse compared to cold gas propulsion systems.
 Alta SpA develops electric and chemical propulsion systems suited for satellites of various size. A critical analysis of different electric propulsion systems was carried out by the company in 2011. The IL-FEEP thruster, a field emission, linear slit propulsion system based on the FEEP heritage, is specially suited for CubeSats and is provided in a compact, 1U version for use on 2U or 3U missions.
 The Vermont Lunar CubeSat launched by Vermont Technical College and funded in part by a grant from Vermont Space Grant Consortium and NASA.
 e-st@r (Educational Satellite @ Polytechnic University of Turin) is a miniaturized satellite built by the Polytechnic University of Turin. It was launched into low Earth orbit on the maiden flight of Arianespace's Vega rocket on the 13th Feb 2012. It is a 1-U CubeSat design weighing 1 kg. The launch was a multi-payload mission shared with LARES, ALMASat-1, Goliat, MaSat-1, PW-Sat, ROBUSTA, UniCubeSat-GG and Xatcobeo.
 The Damping And Vibration Experiment (DAVE, or CP-7), a 1U CubeSat developed by PolySat at California Polytechnic State University, launched in 2018 to test the response of various beams damped in tungsten particles in an orbital environment. The goal of the mission is to test a system that could be used to remove adverse vibrations on future spacecraft with sensitive instruments.
 OPS-SAT is an experimental 3U (7 kg) CubeSat built by TU Graz for ESA. Launched on 18 Dec. 2019 on Soyuz VS23 as tertiary payload together with two other CubeSats, it is "the world's first free-for-use, in-orbit testbed for new software, applications and techniques in satellite control."

Earth remote sensing 

 QuakeSat, by Quakefinder: This satellite was set out on a mission to help scientists improve earthquake detection. The students are hoping that the detection of magnetic signals may have value in showing the onset of an earthquake. The company that put the satellites together is from Palo Alto, California. They're gathering data on the extremely low magnetic field fluctuations that are associated with earthquakes to help better understand this area of study that has its skeptics. The 30 June 2003 deployment of Quakesat was alongside other university CubeSats and one commercial CubeSat. The launch occurred on a Rockot rocket from Russia's Plesetsk launch site.
 SwissCube, by École Polytechnique Fédérale de Lausanne: This project has been selected to fly aboard a new expendable launch system being developed for Arianespace jointly by the Italian Space Agency and the European Space Agency. The rocket is called Vega, and takes its name from the star. The Swiss students will conduct experiments with the air glow phenomenon in the Earth's atmosphere. The satellite's downlink radio will transmit at 437 MHz; the uplink will be at 145 MHz.
 PLUME, by the University of Leicester: They plan to launch a CubeSat that will detect cosmic dust, and will be the first English CubeSat to be launched. The students began their project at the beginning of 2007 and if successful will have a method for scientists to look at the smallest ever dust particles from space. 
 Firefly, by NASA's Goddard Space Flight Center and Siena College: Terrestrial gamma-ray flashes have been detected from the Compton Gamma Ray Observatory after its launch in 1991. Scientists have theories about their origins and this new CubeSat will have instruments that will observe both photons and electrons simultaneously. This, in turn, will allow scientists to better determine if lightning is the source of the gamma-ray bursts.
 ELFIN (Electron Losses and Fields INvestigation) is a 3U CubeSat currently in development by the University of California, Los Angeles. ELFIN will study electron losses in the magnetosphere using a fluxgate magnetometer and two energetic particle detectors (one for ions and one for electrons. ELFIN is a participant in the 8th iteration of the University Nanosatellite Program and is projected to be ready to fly by late 2015.
 ExoCube (CP-10) is a space-weather satellite by PolySat. It measures the in-situ densities of various elements in the Earth's exosphere over incoherent scatter radar.

Space tether 

 MAST, by Tethers Unlimited: The Multi-Application Survivable Tether experiment, based in the United States, was launched 17 April 2007 aboard a Dnepr rocket. This 1 km multistrand, interconnected tether (Hoytether) is being used to test and prove the long-term survivability for tethers in space. The three MAST pico-satellites ejected from the P-POD successfully, but the communications system had difficulties, and the separation mechanism did not function properly, preventing full deployment of the tether. Nonetheless, the experiment operated for over a month and downloaded over 2 MB of data on tethered satellite dynamics as well as images of the tether. While Stanford University formed the academic portion of the team, Tethers Unlimited, from Seattle, Washington, formed the commercial portion of the team.
 STARS (Kukai), by the Kagawa Satellite Development Project at Kagawa University, Japan: The Space Tethered Autonomous Robotic Satellite (STARS) mission launched 23 January 2009 as a secondary payload on a H-IIA launch. After launch, the satellite was named KUKAI, and consisted of two subsatellites, "Ku" and "Kai," to be linked by a 5-meter tether. It was successfully separated from the rocket and transferred into the planned orbit. See also STARS-II microsatellite follow-up with longer (300m) tether.
 Tempo3, by The Mars Society: This operation is called the Tethered Experiment for Mars inter-Planetary Operations and is meant to demonstrate the generation of artificial gravity. The project seeks to enhance knowledge about long term space flight.

Biology 

 GeneSat 1, by the NASA Ames Research Center: In December 2006, a Minotaur launch vehicle carried this satellite into orbit from NASA's Wallops Flight Facility to carry out a genetics experiment. The team assembled the biological growth and analysis systems to perform experiments with E. coli bacteria. The project is not cheap by CubeSat standards: the total spent on the satellite and its experiments were $6 million before the launch took place. The goal is to establish methods for studying the genetic changes that come from being exposed to a space environment. The satellite was outfitted with a UHF beacon.

Other uses 
 Cubesat ROBUSTA, by Montpellier 2 University: A mission to test the effects of radiation on electronics. The goal is to specifically check the deterioration of electronic components based on bipolar transistors when exposed to the space radiation environment. The results of this experiment will be used to validate a test method proposed in the laboratory. The French satellite launched on the maiden flight of Vega in early 2012.
 TJ3Sat, by Thomas Jefferson High School for Science and Technology, Alexandria, VA, which was the first CubeSat ever launched by high school students on November 19, 2013.
iCube-1, by Institute of Space Technology, was Pakistan's first CubeSat. It was manufactured by a team of about 20 faculty members and 15 students. It was launched on 21 November 2013 on board the Dnepr space launch vehicle.
 CINEMA, a collaborative effort between the UC Berkeley Space Sciences Laboratory, Imperial College London, School of Space Research of Kyung Hee University, and the Interamerican University of Puerto Rico: The project's goal is to develop a cubesat that monitors space weather using a combination of magnetometers and particle detectors.
 A CubeSat Inflatable Deorbit Device, by Old Dominion University: This study describes a deployable aerodynamic drag device that can be incorporated in basic 1U CubeSat units that can meet the 25-year orbital lifetime constraint for initial orbit perigees of up to 900 km.
 The NEE-01 Pegaso launched by the Ecuadorian Space Agency in early 2013 was the first known cubesat able to transmit real time video from orbit and broadcast the live feed over the internet.
 SpaceICE ("Interface Convective Effects") is a 3U CubeSat developed by The University of Illinois Urbana-Champaign and Northwestern University to study freeze-casting (a directional solidification technique for the production of porous materials). The SpaceICE mission is scheduled to launch late 2018.

List of launched CubeSats 

There are many types of CubeSats ranging from 0.25u to 16u. In the Type column, the number corresponds to the (approximate) length of the CubeSat in decimetres. Width and depth are normally ten centimetres, or one decimetre. A 1U CubeSat measures approximately 1 × 1 × 1 decimetres, while a 6U CubeSat is six times the size, approximately 1 × 2 × 3 decimetres.

 This list can be sorted by clicking on the heading of any column.

List of CubeSats in development

References

External links 
 The largest Nanosatellite & CubeSat Database
 Cubesat database on Gunter's Space Page
 Small Satellite Database

CubeSats